Manulea wiltshirei is a moth of the family Erebidae. It is found in south-western Asia, including Lebanon.

References

Moths described in 1939
Lithosiina